Richard "Ricky" Berens (born April 21, 1988) is an American former competition swimmer, two-time Olympic gold medalist, world champion, and current world record-holder.  As a member of the U.S. national team, he holds the world record in the 4×200-meter freestyle relay (long course).  He competed in the 4×100-meter and 4×200-meter freestyle relay events, as well as the individual 200-meter freestyle at the 2012 Summer Olympics.

Early years
Berens was born in Charlotte, North Carolina. After graduating from South Mecklenburg High School, he attended the University of Texas at Austin, and swam for coach Eddie Reese's Texas Longhorns swimming and diving team 2007 to 2010. During his collegiate career at Texas, Berens was a 20-time All-American, member of two NCAA champion relay teams, and key contributor to the Longhorns 2010 NCAA team title. He graduated from the University of Texas with a bachelor's degree in finance in 2010, and relocated to Los Angeles shortly thereafter to train with coach Dave Salo at Trojan Aquatics.

International career
At the 2007 Pan American Games, Berens won a gold medal in the 4×100-meter medley relay, and silver medals in both the 4×100-meter freestyle and 4×200-meter freestyle relays.

At the 2008 Summer Olympics, Berens won the gold medal in the men's 4×200-meter freestyle relay with Michael Phelps, Ryan Lochte, and Peter Vanderkaay, setting a new world record of 6:58.56.  Berens swam the third leg in a relay split time of 1:46.29. Berens was the only member of the finals team to swim in the preliminary heats, posting a time of 1:45.47, just faster than Klete Keller's 1:45.51, to be selected to swim in the final.

Berens swam the third leg of the 4×100-meter freestyle preliminaries at the 2009 World Championships in Rome and earned a gold medal when the U.S. team placed first in the final. Berens also swam in both the preliminaries and final of the 4×200-meter freestyle, which won gold. In the final, Berens swam the second leg in 1:44.13, the second fastest split from anyone in the event.

Berens was also a part of the winning U.S. 4×200-meter freestyle relay teams at the 2010 Pan Pacific Swimming Championships and the 2011 World Championships.

At the 2011 Duel in the Pool, a short course meet featuring the United States and European "All-Stars", Berens won both the 100-meter and 200-meter freestyle events.

At the 2012 United States Olympic Trials, the qualifying meet for the 2012 Olympics, Berens made his second Olympic team by finishing fourth in the 100-meter freestyle and third in the 200-meter freestyle, qualifying him to swim in the 4×100-meter freestyle relay and the 4×200-meter freestyle relay, respectively. Although Berens did not qualify to swim in any individual events, Bob Bowman, Michael Phelps's coach, revealed on Twitter that Phelps, who came in first in the 200-meter freestyle, would be scratching the race from his Olympic program, giving the third place Berens a chance to swim his first individual Olympic event.

At the 2012 Summer Olympics in London, Berens again won a gold medal in the men's 4×200-meter freestyle relay, together with Ryan Lochte, Conor Dwyer and Michael Phelps. Berens swam the third leg for the U.S. team in 1:45.27.  He also won a silver medal as part of the second-place U.S. team for the men's 4×100-meter freestyle relay, in which he swam the third leg of the heat in 48.52.

After the final of the 4×200-meter event, Berens stated that he would retire from competitive swimming following the Olympics.

After seven weeks, Berens came out of retirement and returned to the swimming stage. At the 2013 American Short Course Championships, he broke the American record in the 200-yard freestyle (1:31.31), taking his split from the 500-yard freestyle. At the 2013 United States National Championships, Berens finished 5th place in both the 100-meter freestyle and the 200-meter freestyle, qualifying him to swim in the 4 x 100-meter freestyle relay and 4 x 200-meter freestyle relay.

At the 2013 World Aquatics Championships in Barcelona, Berens combined with Conor Dwyer, Ryan Lochte and Charlie Houchin in the 4×200-meter freestyle relay, with the team finishing in first place for the gold medal.  Swimming the anchor leg, Berens recorded a split of 1:45.39, and the team finished with a final time of 7:01.72.

In November 2013, Berens retired for a second time.

Sponsorships and media coverage

In 2008, Berens was interviewed on The Today Show in Beijing after winning gold in the 4×200-meter freestyle relay.  In 2009 he made an appearance on The Tyra Banks Show, poking fun at himself after a swimsuit malfunction at the 2009 World Championships.  In 2011, Berens (alongside his dog) was featured in a print advertisement for Eukanuba that ran in Men's Journal magazine.  Berens was also featured in a print advertisement for a Casio watch, which ran in the December 2011 issue of Details magazine.

Berens was sponsored by TYR Swimwear and by BMW's Pro Performance Team. He also appeared in the "Got Milk?" chocolate milk campaign. Berens is represented by Octagon.

See also

 List of Olympic medalists in swimming (men)
 List of United States records in swimming
 List of University of Texas at Austin alumni
 List of World Aquatics Championships medalists in swimming (men)
 List of world records in swimming
 World record progression 4 × 200 metres freestyle relay

References

External links
 
 
 
 
 
 Ricky Berens – University of Texas athlete profile at TexasSports.com
  

1988 births
Living people
American male freestyle swimmers
Medalists at the FINA World Swimming Championships (25 m)
Medalists at the 2012 Summer Olympics
Medalists at the 2008 Summer Olympics
Olympic gold medalists for the United States in swimming
Olympic silver medalists for the United States in swimming
Pan American Games gold medalists for the United States
Pan American Games silver medalists for the United States
Sportspeople from Charlotte, North Carolina
Swimmers at the 2007 Pan American Games
Swimmers at the 2008 Summer Olympics
Swimmers at the 2012 Summer Olympics
Texas Longhorns men's swimmers
World Aquatics Championships medalists in swimming
World record holders in swimming
Pan American Games medalists in swimming
Medalists at the 2007 Pan American Games
Swimmers from North Carolina